Joseph T. "Jode" Mullally (November 19, 1886–December 29, 1918) was an early American silent film actor born in New Orleans. He appeared in several productions by Cecil B. DeMille and Oscar Apfel. Upon America's entry into World War I, Mullally joined the Navy and reached the rank of Quartermaster. A rising favorite with director DeMille his career was shortened when he died of the Spanish flu in December 1918.

Selected filmography
The Call of the North (1914)
Ready Money (1914)
The Man from Home (1914)
The Circus Man (1914)
The Ghost Breaker (1914)
Cameo Kirby (1914)
After Five (1915)
Snobs (1915)
The Eye of Envy (1917)
 The Blood of His Fathers (1917)

References

External links
 

Who's Who in the Film World picture page 86(1914) *new link

1886 births
1918 deaths
American male silent film actors
20th-century American male actors
Burials at Metairie Cemetery
Deaths from Spanish flu
Infectious disease deaths in Pennsylvania
Male actors from New Orleans
United States Navy personnel of World War I
United States Navy non-commissioned officers